NGC 170 is a lenticular galaxy located in the constellation Cetus. It was discovered on 3 November 1863 by Albert Marth.

See also 
 List of NGC objects (1–1000)

References

External links 
 
 
 SEDS

Astronomical objects discovered in 1863
Cetus (constellation)
Discoveries by Albert Marth
0170
002195
Lenticular galaxies